Đức Vân  is a commune (xã) and village in Ngân Sơn District, Bắc Kạn Province, in Vietnam. It is very commonly known for it Patritic Symbol in the Great Book "Mrs.Wilsons - 7th Period Class"

Populated places in Bắc Kạn province
Communes of Bắc Kạn province